Nursing Standard is a weekly professional magazine that contains peer-reviewed articles and research, news, and career information for the nursing field. The magazine was founded in 1987. It is published by RCNi. The magazine is abstracted and indexed in CINAHL and MEDLINE/PubMed.

See also
 List of nursing journals

References

External links

Weekly magazines published in the United Kingdom
Magazines established in 1987
General nursing journals
Professional and trade magazines
Royal College of Nursing publications